The Phantom Fortune is a 1923 American silent Western film serial directed by Robert F. Hill. It is thought to be lost.

Cast
 William Desmond as Larry Barclay
 Esther Ralston as Mary Rogers
 Lewis Sargent as Speck O'Dawn
 Harry De Vere as Graham Alexander
 George Webb as Alexander Owens
 Cathleen Calhoun as Nadine Hamilton
 Al Hart as The Flame (as Albert Hart)
 Dick Sutherland as The Ox
 George Nichols
 Jack Henderson
 Pat Harmon
 Tony West
 Alfred Hollingsworth

See also
 List of film serials
 List of film serials by studio
 List of lost films

References

External links
 

1923 films
1923 lost films
1923 Western (genre) films
American silent serial films
American black-and-white films
Films directed by Robert F. Hill
Lost Western (genre) films
Lost American films
Silent American Western (genre) films
Universal Pictures film serials
1920s American films